Mudasir Hassan known as Baabarr Mudacer (born in 1995) is an independent musician, singer and rapper from Bandipore, Jammu and Kashmir. He is known for his charity works from music.

Early life
Baabarr was born in 1995 in Dachigam area of Bandipore district of Jammu and Kashmir. His father Ghulam Hassan Dar works in a sawmill and his mother Gulshan Ara is a housewife. He completed his middles studies from Elites Public School Bandipora and later from Nadeem Memorial Boys' Higher Secondary school Bandipora.

Career

In 2012, after dropping studies, he started his career as a rapper. In 2018, he released his debut "Gah Choun Pewaan" which was written by Habba Khatoon.

He owns a registered brand KashGraph, which also provides assistance to students for competitive exams as KashGraph Online Academy.

After eight years of gap from studies in 2019, he joined college for bachelor's degree. , he performed on stage across India at various occasions.

Music career
Mudacer has released a diverse range of songs since his debut in 2018. His discography includes hits such as "Gah Choun Pewaan" (2018), "Zindagi Roshit" (2019), "Haqiqat" (with Abid Wani) (2020), "Dariyaa" (2020), "Khoof" (2021), "Taqdeer" (feat. Ziea Aalam) (2021), and "Peero" (2022).

Discography
This list includes songs performed by him:

Gah Choun Pewaan (2018)
Yaad (2019)
Haqiqat (with Abid Wani) (2020)
Dariyaa (2020)
Zindagi Roshit (2019)
Bella Ciao (feat. Azhar Lone) (2020)
Khoof (2021)
Toofaan (2021)
Taqdeer (feat. Ziea Aalam) (2021)
Lost Kashmir Culture (2021)
Inj Vichre (2021)
Peero (2022)
Yateem (2022)
Hangaam (2022)
Gham-e-Ashiqui (2022)
Toofaan 2 (2022)

References

1995 births
People from Bandipore district
Living people
Kashmiri rappers
Kashmiri Muslims
Kashmiri people